Alexandros Gogić (born 13 April 1994) is a Cypriot professional footballer who plays as a defender and midfielder for St Mirren and the Cyprus national team. He has also previously played for Scottish clubs Hamilton Academical, and Hibernian.

Early and personal life
Gogić is the son of Serbian-born Cypriot international footballer Siniša Gogić.

Club career
Gogić played youth football for Greek club Olympiacos and Welsh club Swansea City. He signed for Scottish club Hamilton Academical in February 2017. In March 2017, Gogić signed a contract extension with Hamilton until May 2018, before signing a further extension, until 2020, in December 2017. On 3 June 2020 he announced that he had left the club.

On 10 July 2020, Gogić signed a two-year contract with Hibernian.

On 31 January 2022, Gogić joined St Mirren, on loan for the rest of the season. He scored on his debut for St Mirren, a 1–1 draw with Motherwell on 1 February. He was released by Hibs in June 2022, at the end of his contract. In August 2022 he signed a two-year contract with St Mirren.

International career
He has represented Cyprus at under-19 and under-21 youth levels. He was first selected for the senior Cyprus national team in September 2020, but had to withdraw when he tested positive for COVID-19. Further tests did not confirm this finding, but he still had to enter a 10-day period of self-isolation that prevented him from playing. He made his senior debut with Cyprus a month later, in a 2–1 friendly loss to Czech Republic on 7 October.

Career statistics

International appearances

References

External links

1994 births
Living people
Cypriot footballers
Cypriot people of Serbian descent
Olympiacos F.C. players
Swansea City A.F.C. players
Hamilton Academical F.C. players
Scottish Professional Football League players
Association football defenders
Association football midfielders
Cyprus youth international footballers
Cyprus under-21 international footballers
Cyprus international footballers
Cypriot expatriate footballers
Cypriot expatriates in Greece
Expatriate footballers in Greece
Cypriot expatriates in Wales
Expatriate footballers in Wales
Cypriot expatriate sportspeople in Scotland
Expatriate footballers in Scotland
Hibernian F.C. players
St Mirren F.C. players